A Portuguese passport is an identity document issued to citizens of Portugal for the purpose of international travel. The passport, along with the Citizen Card allows for free rights of movement and residence in any of the states of the European Union, European Economic Area and Switzerland. Every Portuguese citizen is also a citizen of the European Union.

Electronic passport
As of 28 August 2006, the Portuguese government began issuing electronic passports (commonly abbreviated as PEP) which in addition to containing enhanced security features also contain a contact-less microchip. The microchip includes all the biographic information printed in the passport as well as a digital version of the photograph suitable for use in digital facial recognition. While fingerprint information is obtained when applying for the passport, it is not included in the passport itself. European Union member states will be required to include fingerprint information in their passports by 28 February 2008.

The PEP meets ICAO standards for electronic passports, and contains the biometric passport symbol (a small eye-like image). The PEP meets all the requirements for the United States Visa Waiver Program. The passport is valid for 5 years, and can not be renewed (when it expires a new application needs to be made). Passports issued before the PEP are still valid as long as they have not passed their dates of expiry.

Appearance
The 2006 version electronic passport was designed by Henrique Cayatte. Its final form incorporated a set of thematic elements related to Portuguese poets Luís Vaz de Camões and Fernando Pessoa in both its technical and aesthetic elements. Images were provided by the Portuguese painter Júlio Pomar.
The current 2017 version was designed by Jorge Silva. It features a set of 20 elements of the Portuguese UNESCO World Heritage throughout the interior pages.

Cover
The regular passport is a deep red colour with golden print, and is written only in Portuguese. Following European Union Standards the passport bears the title União Europeia above the country name and the title of Passaporte. The passport contains images of the Portuguese Coat-of-arms.

Security features on the cover include: invisible ink printing which is visible under an ultraviolet light.

Biographic information page

The biographic information is the first page at the front of the passport. It includes the following information:
Type
Code of Issuing
Passport Nr.
1) Surname
2) Name
3) Nationality
4) Height
5) Date of Birth
6) Personal Nr.
7) Sex (M/F)
8) Place of Birth 
9) Date of Issue
10) Authority
11) Date of Expiry
12) Holder's Signature

Visa Pages
The passport has 32 pages (excluding the biographic information page), however only 28 are suitable for visas (the other 4 pages include the translation of the fields in the biographic page into each of the official languages of the EU)

Security features on the visa pages include: security paper with watermark (the Portuguese Coat of Arms), passport number is perforated into the bottom of all pages.

Languages

Following European Union passport standards, the passport contains all official languages of the EU. The cover is only printed in Portuguese (translations are inside the first page.) The fields on the biographic page are printed in Portuguese, English, and French (in that order), with translations in the last three pages of the passport

Application
All citizens of Portugal are entitled to a Portuguese passport. In Portugal, applications for a Portuguese passport need to be made in person in particular Civil Registries or Departments of Citizen Cards (one or more existing in every Portuguese parish) or in a Loja do Cidadão (in the Azores, RIAC – Rede Integrada de Apoio ao Cidadão) (English: Citizen's Assistance Centres). Overseas applications need to be made in person at a consular authority (i.e. embassy, consulate-general, or consulate).

To apply for a passport, an individual needs to provide proof of citizenship i.e. with a valid Bilhete de Identidade or a valid Cartão de Cidadão. Consular authorities may require other pieces of identification (i.e. expired passports) as required by local law. Currently no photograph is required, as a digital photograph is taken at the time of the application.

Gallery of historic images

Visa free travel

Visa requirements for Portuguese citizens are administrative entry restrictions by the authorities of other states placed on citizens of Portugal. As of 28 September 2022, Portuguese citizens had visa-free or visa on arrival access to 187 countries and territories, ranking the Portuguese passport 6th in terms of travel freedom (tied with the passports of France, Ireland, and the UK) according to the Henley Passport Index.

See also

Portuguese nationality law
Visa requirements for Portuguese citizens
Bilhete de Identidade
Passports of the European Union
Visa policy of the Schengen Area

References

External links

 http://www.pep.pt/ (Portuguese language) Official website of the Portuguese Electronic Passport.
 Some of the content of this article comes from the equivalent Portuguese-language Wikipedia article (retrieved 29 November 2006).

Portugal
Law of Portugal
European Union passports